Artibonite may refer to:
 Artibonite (department), an administrative subdivision of Haiti
 Artibonite River, a river in Haiti and the longest in Hispaniola
 Artibonite Valley, a valley predominantly in Haiti but also extends a bit in the Dominican Republic
 Artibonite Group, a geologic group in Haiti
 Petite Rivière de l'Artibonite, a commune in the Dessalines Arrondissement, of the department of Artibonite in Haiti